Alliance for Welfare and Solidarity (in Albanian: Aleanca per Mirqenie dhe Solidaritet) is a political party in Albania. It is led by Koço Danaj.

References

External links 
 AMS website

Political parties in Albania